Stephen P. Anderson (born 1967) is an American musician, songwriter and expressionist painter.

Discography

Albums
 Zonic Shockum (Zonic Shockum) 1997 Stain Music STM-009
 Blackbirds Over Lancaster (solo) 2007 Beef Eater Records BE-012
 Noisy Troubadour – Home Recordings from 1988–2008 (solo) 2008 Beef Eater Records BE-013
 Sessions 1989-1995 (Zonic Shockum) 2013 Beef Eater Records BE-014

EPs
 Testosterone (Zonic Shockum)1992 Compulsiv CPS 004
 Electrocarnivorous (Bladder Control)  1993 Beef Eater Records BE-002
 Here Today... (Zonic Shockum) 2001 Stain Music Stm-011

Podcasts
 Local Support 066 (2008)

Soundtracks
 "The Wedding Song" recording by Zonic Shockum featured in Go-Go Rama Mama (1997), a 16mm film by Kate McCabe
 "Opposites Attack" solo recording featured in Milk and Honey (2004), a 16mm film by Kate McCabe

Art Exhibitions
 Stephen Anderson (1988) Rapunzel Salon, Philadelphia, PA
 Rittenhouse Square Fine Arts Annual (1989) Philadelphia, PA
 Arts 90 (1990) Provident National Bank, Philadelphia, PA
 Souls on Show (1991) Jamisons Bakery and Cafe, Philadelphia, PA
 Snitches Get Stitches (2004) Eye Candy Gallery, Kutztown, PA
 A Strange Kind of Ordinary (2005) Popmart, Bethlehem, PA
 The Horror Show (2005) Popmart, Bethlehem, PA
 Best in Bloom (2009) The Shops of Emmaus, PA
 Animals Art Show (2011) Southern Lehigh Public Library, Center Valley, PA
 Kick It For Kathy (2015) Leopard Studios, Philadelphia, PA
 Summer Pleasures (2021) Modern Visual Arts Gallery, Bethlehem, PA
 Absolutely Abstract (2021) Modern Visual Arts Gallery, Bethlehem, PA
 The Power of Abstracts (2022) Modern Visual Arts Gallery, Bethlehem, PA

References

External links
 Spotify
 iTunes
 How to Build a Flemish Twist Bow String by Stephen P. Anderson
 Learn Two Ways of How to Serve a String by Stephen P. Anderson

1967 births
Living people
People from Elkton, Maryland
Artists from Pennsylvania
American rock guitarists
American male guitarists
American singer-songwriters
American male singer-songwriters
American rock songwriters
American rock singers
American artists
20th-century American guitarists
20th-century American male musicians
Modern painters